The Tionety uezd was a county (uezd) of the Tiflis Governorate of the Caucasus Viceroyalty of the Russian Empire, and then of Democratic Republic of Georgia, with its administrative centre in Tionety (present-day Tianeti). The area of the uezd roughly corresponded to the contemporary Mtskheta-Mtianeti region of Georgia.

History 
Following the Russian Revolution, the Tionety uezd was incorporated into the short-lived Democratic Republic of Georgia.

Administrative divisions 
The subcounties (uchastoks) of the Tionety uezd in 1913 were as follows:

Demographics

Russian Empire Census 
The majority of the population indicated Georgian to be their mother tongue, with a significant Chechen speaking minority.

Kavkazskiy kalendar 

See also 
History of the administrative division of Russia

Notes

References

Bibliography 

Caucasus Viceroyalty (1801–1917)
Tiflis Governorate
Uezds of Tiflis Governorate
Modern history of Georgia (country)
1880 establishments in the Russian Empire
States and territories established in 1880
States and territories disestablished in 1918